Perciana marmorea is a species of moth of the family Erebidae first described by Francis Walker in 1865. It is found in Taiwan and India.

References

Moths described in 1865
Hypeninae